Collpacaja (possibly from Quechua qullpa salty, salpeter, qaqa rock, "salpeter rock") is a mountain in the southern extensions of the Vilcanota mountain range in the Andes of Peru, about  high. The mountain is situated in the Puno Region, Melgar Province, Nuñoa District. Collpacaja lies south of the mountain Yanacocha. West of it there is a small lake named Quellhuacocha ("gull lake").

References

Mountains of Puno Region
Mountains of Peru